The First Yoshida Cabinet was the 45th Cabinet of Japan led by Shigeru Yoshida from May 22, 1946 to May 24, 1947.

Cabinet

Reshuffled Cabinet 
A Cabinet reshuffle took place on January 31, 1947.

References 

Cabinet of Japan
1946 establishments in Japan
Cabinets established in 1946
Cabinets disestablished in 1947
1947 disestablishments in Japan